Marlin Records was one of the record labels set-up by Henry Stone before he launched the successful TK Records.

See also
 List of record labels

Defunct record labels of the United States